Butbut Kalinga is a language of the Kalinga dialect continuum. Ethnologue reports 15,000 speakers for the language and 1,000 monolinguists.

Distribution 
Ethnologue reports that Butbut Kalinga is spoken in the following areas:

Cordillera Administrative Region: Kalinga province: Tinglayan municipality: Bugnay, Buscalan, Butbut Proper, Loccong, and Ngibat villages; Tabuk City, Dinongsay, Ileb, Kataw, Lacnog, and Pakak villages; Rizal Municipality: Andaraya, Anonang, Bua, and Malapiat villages.

Similarities 
Ethnologue reports the following similarities with other Philippine languages, Namely: Limos Kalinga, Ilocano, Tanudan Kalinga, Bangad Kalinga (Southern Kalinga).

Lexical similarities with other languages 
Ethnologue reports that the language is Lexically similar with some languages and dialects:

82% of Southern Kalinga and 78% with Guina-ang (a dialect of Tanudan Kalinga), and Tanudan Kalinga.

Typology 
Ethnologue reports the following typology for this language:

VSO; Prepositions; Genitives after noun heads; articles normally before adjectives, numerals and noun heads; question-word in sentence-initial position; 3 maximum suffixes;

word order distinguishes subjects; objects and indirect objects, given and new information, topic and comment; affixes do not indicate case of noun phrases; verb affixes mark number; passives; causatives; comparatives; CV, CVC; nontonal.

Language use 
This language is used in Home, community, church. Used by all. Positive attitudes. Most also use Ilocano, which is acquired through school, travel, media, and use in church.

References

See also 

 Ilocano language
 Kalinga language
 Ilocano people

Languages of Kalinga (province)
Indigenous languages of Asia
Ilocano language